Mikhail Surenovich Aloyan (born 23 August 1988) is a Russian professional boxer who challenged for the WBO bantamweight title in 2018. As an amateur flyweight Aloyan won gold medals at the 2010 European Championships, the 2011 and 2013 World Championships, and bronze at the 2009 World Championships and 2012 Olympics.

Amateur career 

At Moscow 2010 he beat Nordine Oubaali, Vincenzo Picardi and Khalid Saeed Yafai to win the European Championships.

At Baku 2011, he added a World title by defeating Rau'shee Warren and edging Welshman Andrew Selby 13–12.

At the 2012 Summer Olympics, he beat Samir Brahimi and Jeyvier Cintron before losing to Nyambayaryn Tögstsogt in the semifinal. He won another medal four years later in Rio 2016, a silver.

On 8 December 2016 he was stripped of the silver medal in 52 kg boxing won at the Rio 2016 Summer Olympics after testing positive for tuaminoheptane.

Professional boxing career
Aloyan made his professional debut against Yader Cardoza on 11 May 2017, in a fight for the vacant WBA East Asia super-flyweight title. He won the fight by unanimous decision. Aloyan next faced Marvin Solano for the vacant WBC Silver super-flyweight title on 22 July 2017, and won the fight by unanimous decision. Five months later, on 9 December 2017, Aloyan was scheduled to face Hermogenes Elizabeth Castillo for the vacant WBA International bantamweight title. He won the fight by split decision. Aloyan made his first, and only, WBA International title defense against Alexander Espinoza on 3 February 2018, and won the fight by split decision.

Aloyan vs. Tete 
Aloyan participated in the 2018 World Boxing Super Series bantamweight tournament. He was scheduled to face the WBO World bantamweight champion Zolani Tete in the tournament quarterfinals, on 13 October 2018. Tete won the fight by unanimous decision, with scores of 114-111, 114-111 and 114-110. Both fighters were deducted a point for excessive holding, Tete in the eleventh and Aloyan in the twelfth round.

Aloyan vs. Batista 
Aloyan was scheduled to face Ronal Batista for the inaugural WBA Gold super-flyweight title on 10 December 2019. Batista was ranked #14 by the WBA at super flyweight. He won the fight by unanimous decision.

Aloyan vs. Hryshchuk 
He made his first WBA Gold title defense against Oleksandr Hryshchuk on 4 June 2021. Hryshchuk retired from the bout at the end of the eight round.

Aloyan vs. Yohana 
Aloyan faced Mchanja Yohana on 22 July 2021. He won the fight by unanimous decision, with all three judges awarding him a 99-91 scorecard.

On 30 January 2022, Aloyan held a press conference, during which he announced he would retire after his next fight.

Aloyan vs. Barreto 
On 8 February, it was announced that Aloyan would face David Barreto in his farewell fight, on 21 February 2022. Aloyan won the fight by majority decision.

Professional boxing record

See also 

Yazidis in Armenia

References

External links 
 
 
 
 Mikhail Aloyan - Profile, News Archive & Current Rankings at Box.Live

1988 births
Living people
People from Armavir Province
Flyweight boxers
Super-flyweight boxers
Bantamweight boxers
Southpaw boxers
Olympic boxers of Russia
Boxers at the 2012 Summer Olympics
Boxers at the 2016 Summer Olympics
Olympic bronze medalists for Russia
Olympic medalists in boxing
Medalists at the 2012 Summer Olympics
Competitors stripped of Summer Olympics medals
World boxing champions
AIBA World Boxing Championships medalists
Armenian Yazidis
Russian Yazidis
Kurds in Russia
Kurds in Armenia
Russian sportspeople of Armenian descent
Russian male boxers
Doping cases in boxing
Russian sportspeople in doping cases
Universiade medalists in boxing
Universiade silver medalists for Russia